The Luang Prabang montane rain forests ecoregion (WWF ID: IM0121) covers elevations over 800 meters in the Luang Prabang mountains that straddle the border between northern Thailand and north-central Laos, and the highlands that stretch eastward across north-central Laos.  While much of the forest cover has been degraded, there are still large areas of relatively untouched forest.

Location and description 

The Luang Prabang range is the easternmost of the north-south mountain ranges of northern Thailand.  Together with the highlands of north-central Loas they form an ecoregion of very high rainfall (2,000-3,000 mm/year) and a relatively long dry season.

Climate 
The climate of the ecoregion is Tropical monsoon climate (Köppen climate classification (Aw)).  This climate is characterized by relatively even temperatures throughout the year (all months being greater than  average temperature), and a pronounced dry season.  The driest month has less than 60 mm of precipitation, but more than (100-(monthly average)/25) mm.  The dry month usually at or right after the winter solstice in the Northern Hemisphere.  Rainfall in the mountains of northern Laos can average 2,000-3,000 mm/year.

Flora 
There is not one single type of rainforest in the ecoregion.  Rather, there are many different forest communities reflecting location, altitude, and local climate.  Starting at 800 meters elevation, the lower tropical seasonal rainforest becomes the montane rainforest, with a dominant canopy of Dipterocarpus turbinatus (source of keruing wood), and Wax tree (Toxicodendron succedaneum).  Also present at this transitional level are palm trees such as the Sugar palm (Arenga pinnata).  At elevations of 1,500 meters, broadleaf evergreen forests of Castanopsis hystrix are found.  The low, open nature of the forest may be due to past clearing or fire.  At these levels there are also conifer hardwood forests of Quercus griffithii (an oak with an oblong crown) and Keteleeria (Keteleeria evelyniana).  Thinner soils support Engelhardia on granitic soils, or Khasi pine (Pinus kesiya) on clay or sandstone.

Fauna 
Due to the relative isolation of the area, there are significant populations of rare large mammals including the critically endangered Red-shanked douc, the endangered Asian elephant and the endangered Eld's deer.  Over 540 bird species are known to have territory extending into the ecoregion.

Protected areas 
Protected areas in the ecoregion include:
 Nam Phouy National Biodiversity Conservation Area, home to the largest population of wild elephants in Laos. (2,000 km2)
 Khun Nan National Park, on the Thai side of the Luang Prabang, known for its waterfalls and streams. (249 km2)
 Phou Khao Khouay, 40 km north of Vientiane in Laos, with three large rivers flowing into the Mekong River. (80,000 km2)
 Phu Luang Wildlife Sanctuary, in northern Thailand, supports a population of 100 wild Asian Elephants.  (897 km2).
 Nam Nao National Park, in the Luang Prabang of northern, supporting Thailand different forest types, deciduous and evergreen. (1,000 km2)

References 

Ecoregions of Laos
Ecoregions of Thailand
Ecoregions of Vietnam
Indomalayan ecoregions
Tropical and subtropical moist broadleaf forests
Montane forests